Dayton Township is one of twelve townships in Chickasaw County, Iowa, USA.  As of the 2000 census, its population was 1,752.

History
Dayton Township was organized in 1859. It is named for William L. Dayton.

Geography
According to the USGS, it contains three cemeteries: Children of Israel, New Hampton and Saint Marys.

The stream of Spring Branch runs through this township.

Notes

References
 USGS Geographic Names Information System (GNIS)

External links
 US-Counties.com
 City-Data.com

Townships in Chickasaw County, Iowa
Townships in Iowa
1859 establishments in Iowa
Populated places established in 1859